The Gigolo is an album by jazz trumpeter Lee Morgan released on the Blue Note label in 1968. It was recorded on June 25 & July 1, 1965 and features performances by Morgan with a quintet featuring Wayne Shorter, Harold Mabern, Bob Cranshaw and Billy Higgins.

Reception
The Allmusic review by Scott Yanow awarded the album 4½ stars stating "There are no weak selections on this set and the playing by the leader, Wayne Shorter on tenor, pianist Harold Mabern, bassist Bob Cranshaw, and drummer Billy Higgins is beyond any serious criticism."

Track listing 
All compositions by Lee Morgan except where noted
 "Yes I Can, No You Can't" – 7:26
 "Trapped" (Wayne Shorter) – 5:59
 "Speedball" – 5:32
 "The Gigolo" – 11:07
 "You Go to My Head" (J. Fred Coots, Haven Gillespie) – 7:22
 "The Gigolo" [Alternate Take] – 10:04 Bonus track on CD

Recorded on June 25 (#2) and July 1 (all others), 1965.

Personnel 
 Lee Morgan – trumpet
 Wayne Shorter – tenor saxophone
 Harold Mabern – piano
 Bob Cranshaw – bass
 Billy Higgins – drums

References 

Hard bop albums
Lee Morgan albums
1968 albums
Blue Note Records albums
Albums produced by Alfred Lion
Albums recorded at Van Gelder Studio